In music, Op. 109 stands for Opus number 109. Compositions that are assigned this number include:

 Beethoven – Piano Sonata No. 30
 Dvořák – The Golden Spinning Wheel
 Fauré – Cello Sonata No. 1
 Glazunov – Saxophone Concerto
 Schumann – Ball-Scenen (Scenes from a Ball) (piano 4 hands)
 Sibelius – The Tempest